National Route 304 is a national highway of Japan connecting Kanazawa, Ishikawa and Nanto, Toyama, with a total length of 48.6 km (30.2 mi).

References

National highways in Japan
Roads in Ishikawa Prefecture
Roads in Toyama Prefecture